The Assistant Secretary of State for South and Central Asian Affairs is the head of the Bureau of South and Central Asian Affairs within the United States Department of State, which handles U.S. foreign policy and relations in the following countries: Afghanistan, Bangladesh, Bhutan, India, Kyrgyzstan, Kazakhstan, Maldives, Nepal, Pakistan, Sri Lanka, Tajikistan, Turkmenistan, and Uzbekistan.

The position of Assistant Secretary of State for South Asian Affairs was renamed when responsibility for policy for five countries (Kazakhstan, Uzbekistan, Kyrgyzstan, Tajikistan, and Turkmenistan) was transferred from the Bureau of European and Eurasian Affairs to the Bureau of South Asian Affairs, which became the Bureau of South and Central Asian Affairs. Richard A. Boucher was sworn in as the first to hold the current title on February 21, 2006 after the previous Assistant Secretary, Christina B. Rocca, left the Department.

List of Assistant Secretaries of State for South Asian Affairs

References

External links

A press release from the Department of State on the creation of the Bureau of South and Central Asian Affairs
The biography of the current Assistant Secretary at the Department of State website.
The Department of State's list of former Assistant Secretaries

 
United States–Asian relations
1992 establishments in the United States